The 1986 New York Jets season was the 27th season for the team and the seventeenth in the National Football League. It began with the team trying to improve upon its 11–5 record from 1985 and return to the playoffs under head coach Joe Walton. The Jets finished the season with a record of 10–6, qualifying for the top Wild Card spot in the playoffs despite losing their last five games of the season. They defeated the Kansas City Chiefs in the Wild Card round, but lost to the Cleveland Browns in the divisional round. The loss to the Browns is infamous in Jets history. Leading 20–10 in the 4th quarter, the Jets collapsed when Mark Gastineau hammered Browns quarterback Bernie Kosar seconds after he released a pass; Gastineau was flagged for roughing the passer and the Browns rallied to force overtime and win early in the game's second overtime.

The Week 3 game against Miami was memorable as Ken O'Brien and Dolphins quarterback Dan Marino fought a wild shootout that culminated in the Jets winning 51–45 in overtime. Marino threw for 448 yards and six TD passes while O'Brien accumulated 479 yards, four touchdowns, and one interception for what would statistically be the best game of his career.

Offseason

NFL Draft

Roster

Depth chart

Schedule

Regular season

Game summaries

Week 1 at Buffalo Bills 

The Jets spoiled the debut of Bills quarterback Jim Kelly.

Week 2: vs. New England Patriots 
The NFL scheduled the Jets to host the Patriots in a rare Thursday night game. The Jets were limited to two field goals as Tony Collins caught two touchdowns in a 20–6 Jets loss where the two teams combined for just 486 yards of offense.

Week 3 vs. Dolphins 

The Jets-Dolphins rivalry reached an apex in this Week 3 matchup as Ken O'Brien and Dan Marino unleashed ten combined touchdowns, the last a 43-yard score to Wesley Walker and a 51–45 overtime win for the Jets.

Week 4: at Indianapolis Colts 
The two teams combined for six fumbles and three interceptions as Pat Leahy booted four field goals and Ken O'Brien had a touchdown throw for the Jets’ 26–7 win.

Week 5: vs. Buffalo Bills 
The Jets limited Jim Kelly to 211 yards, one touchdown, and one interception as Mickey Shuler caught the winning 36-yard touchdown for a 14–13 New York win.

Week 6: at New England Patriots 
Johnny Hector and Steve Grogan had memorable performances as the Jets raced to a 24–0 halftime lead. Subbing for injured Tony Eason, Grogan stormed the Patriots back in the second half with three touchdowns and a career-high 401 passing yards. Hector, with a career-high 143 rushing yards, also scored three times, and in the final minute Grogan completed a deep pass to Irving Fryar, but Fryar fumbled to the Jets, ending a 31–24 Jets win.

Week 7: Monday Night Football at Denver Broncos 
The two teams used four quarterbacks (John Elway, Gary Kubiak, Ken O'Brien, and Pat Ryan) and combined for ten quarterback sacks, 22 penalties (for 172 yards), and just 490 yards of offense as the Jets ran away with a 22-10 win.

Week 8: vs. New Orleans Saints 
Despite being shut out 17–0 in the fourth quarter, the Jets beat the Saints 28–23. Al Toon caught three touchdowns against his son's future team and Freeman McNeil added a fourth score. The Jets grabbed three fumbles and picked off the Saints twice.

Week 9: at Seattle Seahawks 
Gale Gilbert was intercepted twice as the Jets crushed the Seahawks 38–7. Ken O'Brien threw for 431 yards and four touchdowns as the Jets put up 553 yards of offense.

Week 10: at Atlanta Falcons 
Three Ken O'Brien touchdowns in the second quarter were enough to upend the Falcons in a 28–14 final. O'Brien and Falcons quarterback David Archer combined for 672 passing yards.

Week 11: vs. Indianapolis Colts 
The Jets picked off Jack Trudeau four times and won 31–16, their ninth straight win putting them at a seemingly commanding 10–1.

Week 12: Monday Night Football at Miami Dolphins 
Mounting injuries for the Jets had steadily weakened the club and the repercussions began in a 45–3 massacre by the Dolphins in Miami. Dan Marino tossed four touchdowns and Lorenzo Hampton blasted to 188 all-purpose yards and three scores. Ken O'Brien completed just 11 of 21 passes with an interception, and Pat Ryan took over under center but was picked off himself; the Jets also fumbled twice.

Week 13: vs. LA Rams 
Three years after the infamous set-to between Jackie Slater and Mark Gastineau the Rams returned to The Meadowlands and won 17–3. Despite 350 yards of offense the Jets managed the one field goal while coughing up four turnovers and committing eight penalties to one Rams foul.

Week 14: at San Francisco 49ers 
Four Niners backs (including ex-Buffalo Bill Joe Cribbs) rushed for 198 yards and three scores as the Niners won 24–10, knocking the Jets to 10–4.

Week 15 vs. Steelers 

In a Saturday NFL doubleheader with the Broncos–Redskins game following, the Jets hosted the Steelers and were buried 45–24. Ken O'Brien and Pat Ryan combined for 262 yards and two touchdowns but were intercepted three times as five Steelers backs rushed for 175 yards and three touchdowns.

Week 16: at Cincinnati Bengals 
The AFC East slipped away from the Jets as they were crushed 52–21 by the Bengals. Boomer Esiason exploded to five touchdowns as the Jets had to settle for a wildcard playoff spot.

Postseason

AFC Wild Card Playoffs 

 Scoring
 KC – Smith 1 run (kick failed)
 NYJ – McNeil 4 run (Leahy kick)
 NYJ – McNeil 1 pass from Ryan (Leahy kick)
 NYJ – Toon 11 pass from Ryan (Leahy kick)
 NYJ – McArthur 21 interception return (Leahy kick)
 KC – Lewis recovered blocked punt in end zone (Lowery kick)
 NYJ – Griggs 6 pass from Ryan (Leahy kick)
 KC – Safety, Jennings ran out of end zone

AFC Divisional Playoff

Standings

References

External links 
 1986 statistics

New York Jets seasons
New York Jets
New York Jets season
20th century in East Rutherford, New Jersey
Meadowlands Sports Complex